is a railway station in Karatsu, Saga Prefecture, Japan. It is operated by JR Kyushu and is on the Chikuhi Line. The station is set within the Nijinomatsubara pine forest, which gives it its name.

Lines
Only local services on the Chikuhi Line stop at this station.

Station layout 
The station consists of a side platform serving a single track. The station building is a simple wooden shed of traditional Japanese design with a tiled roof. It is unstaffed and serves to only to house a waiting room and an automatic ticket machine.

Adjacent stations

History
On 7 July 1924, the line was extended westwards with Nijinomatsubara opening as its new western terminus. When the Kitakyushu Railway was nationalized on 1 October 1937, Japanese Government Railways (JGR) took over control of the station. On the same day, the station name was in Japanese characters was changed from 虹の松原駅 to 虹ノ松原駅, a switch of the second character from hiragana to katakana, with no change in reading or transliteration. The line which served the station was designated the Chikuhi Line. With the privatization of Japanese National Railways (JNR), the successor of JGR, on 1 April 1987, control of the station passed to JR Kyushu.

Passenger statistics
In fiscal 2015, there were a total of 56,268 boarding passengers, giving a daily average of 154 passengers.

Environs
Nijinomatsubara
Mount Kagami

See also
 List of railway stations in Japan

References

External links
Nijinomatsubara Station (JR Kyushu)

Railway stations in Japan opened in 1924
Chikuhi Line
Railway stations in Saga Prefecture
Stations of Kyushu Railway Company